The Indiana–Slovakia National Guard Partnership is one of 25 European partnerships that make-up the U.S. European Command State Partnership Program and one of 88 worldwide partnerships that make up the National Guard State Partnership Program.  Since its inception in 1994, the Indiana and Slovakia partnership has grown steadily in its offerings, training events, and personnel.

History

"There are few subjects as important to me as our State Partnership Program with Slovakia. This is an extraordinary program, which has far exceeded our expectations. We have learned, we have shared and we have been enriched." - MG Martin Umbarger, Adjutant General, Indiana National Guard

Overview
 Indiana-Slovakia Partnership since 1994
 NATO member since 2004.
 EU member since 1 May 2004
 UN member since 31 July 1992
 Full partner in NATO
 Executed over 200 bi-lateral events since partnership began
 Participated in KFOR 2004-2010
 Participating in Cyprus UN Mission
 Slovakia's military is made up of land, air, air defense and special forces
 Advanced Economy based on increasing privatization of business characterized with high economic growth.

When Czechoslovakia divided into the Czech Republic and Slovakia in 1993, the Department of Defense and the U.S. State Department saw a great opportunity to become allies with these two new nations. The decision to partner Slovakia with Indiana came in large because in the late 19th and early 20th century, many Slovak immigrants came to work in the factories in northern Indiana and were essential in making Indiana what it is today. The two militaries have exchanged troops, techniques and training procedures in over 200 bi-lateral events since partnership began. Events have included, among other things:

 NCO Development
 Flight Training
 Fire Support Planning
 Intelligence Preparation of the Battlefield
 Military Decision Making Process

In 2004, Slovakia realized the goal it had set from the start of the partnership - full NATO membership. Slovakia also gained membership into the European Union that same year.

As a further testament to the accomplishments of the Indiana-Slovakia partnership, Indiana Guardsmen and Slovak troops deployed side by side to Afghanistan in 2011. For 10 months, they served under the command of an SAF officer as an Operation Mentor and Liaison Team mentoring Afghan logistics troops.

Partnership focus

2013 Panned Events:
 Disaster Response Crisis Management
 Cyber Security
 CBRNE (Chemical, Biological, Radiological, Nuclear and Explosive)
 Rotary Wing Interoperability
 MAT VI and MAT VII Training Development

MG Umbarger, the Adjutant General of the Indiana National Guard, has taken on five significant initiatives for consideration in the coming years:

 Continued emphasis on Joint SAF/INNG Operational Mentor and Liaison Teams in Afghanistan
 A study of the viability and parameters of a reserve force in Slovakia
 Initiation of a query into a second partnership, possibly in Africa
 Feasibility study into a joint partnership with Slovakia and a third nation
 Slovakia and INNG mobilizing as a joint Agribusiness Development Team

References

External links

The EUCOM State Partnership page for Indiana-Slovakia
The Indiana National Guard SPP
Department of Defense News on the Indiana-Slovakia Partnership
EUCOM SPP
National Guard Bureau SPP
National Guard Bureau SPP News Archives

Military alliances involving the United States
Slovakia–United States military relations
National Guard (United States)